Cheche may refer to:

Tagelmust, indigo-dyed cotton garment
Chéché, village in the Gabú Region of north-eastern Guinea-Bissau
Action sociale CHECHE, an organization in the Democratic Republic of Congo

People with the name 
Cheche Alara, music director
Cheche Lázaro, Filipino broadcast journalist 
Cheche Vidal, retired Venezuelan association football defender